"King Kong Song" (working title "Mr. Sex"), written and composed by Benny Andersson and Björn Ulvaeus, is the name of a 1974 recording by Swedish pop group ABBA, included on their album Waterloo. In 1974, the song competed in the Swedish radio chart show Tio i topp, where it stayed in the charts for four shows and peaked at number 4. Also in Sweden, "King Kong Song" was the B-side to "Honey, Honey".

In 1975, the song was released as the B-side to the single release of "I've Been Waiting for You" in Australia, where it reached number 49.

Charts

Weekly charts

Cover versions
 Alternative rock band Electric Boys recorded a cover of the song for the 1992 Swedish tribute album ABBA: The Tribute, released on the Polar Music label.
 Swedish band Moahni Moahna recorded a cover for their 1996 album Why.

References

1974 songs
1977 singles
ABBA songs
Polar Music singles
King Kong (franchise)
Novelty songs
Songs about fictional male characters
Songs about monsters
Songs about primates
Songs written by Benny Andersson and Björn Ulvaeus